Aquamarine may refer to:
 Aquamarine (color), a shade between green and blue 
 Aquamarine (gemstone),  a type of blue beryl

Aquamarine may also refer to:

Arts and media
 Aquamarine (novel), a 2001 novel by Alice Hoffman
 Aquamarine (film), a 2006 film based on the book by Alice Hoffman
 "Aqua Marine" (song), by Santana from the album Dance of the Rainbow Serpent
 "Aquamarine" (Drugstore song), from the album Anatomy
 Aquamarine (album), by Ash Walker
 Aquamarine, a character on the Cartoon Network show Steven Universe
 Aquamarine (video game), a 2022 adventure game by Moebial Studios

Other uses
 Aquamarine (window decorator), a software application
 USS Aquamarine (PYc-7), a patrol vessel of the United States Navy, named for the stone
 Aqua Marine, a private housing estate in Cheung Sha Wan, Hong Kong
 One of the former names of the motor vessel Ocean Star Pacific

See also
 Aquamarine Power, a wave energy company that developed the Oyster wave energy converter
 Aquamarine Fukushima, an aquarium in Fukushima
 Aquamarina, a fungal genus
 Aquimarina, a bacterial genus